Dillibe Onyeama (6 January 1951 – 10 November 2022) was a Nigerian author and publisher. In 1969, he became the first black person to finish his studies at Eton College in England. He wrote a book about his experiences of racism at Eton, Nigger at Eton, which resulted in his being banned from visiting the school by then-headmaster Michael McCrum.

Biography
Dillibe Charles Onyeama was born in Enugu, Nigeria, in 1951, the second son of Charles Onyeama, a Justice of the Supreme Court of Nigeria and Judge at the International Court of Justice who was himself the son of Onyeama of Eke, a ruling chief in the Nigerian chieftaincy system. On the day of his birth, he became the first black boy to be registered to attend Eton College. He attended preparatory school at Grove Park in Sussex, before becoming a pupil at Eton in 1965, and leaving in 1969. Onyeama wrote a book while still a teenager about his experiences of racist discrimination and bullying at the elite British boarding school: Nigger at Eton, published in 1972 by Leslie Frewin Limited, which was republished by Penguin in 2022 with the title A Black Boy at Eton.

In 2020 the school's present headmaster, Simon Henderson, offered Onyeama an apology for the treatment he had received. Onyeama said he would return to Eton to accept the apology as long as the costs of his trip were covered.

Onyeama obtained a diploma from the Premier School of Journalism, incorporating the Writers School of Great Britain  before returning to Nigeria In 1981, and establishing the publishing company Delta Publications, based in Enugu.

Onyeama died from a heart attack on 10 November 2022, at the age of 71.

Selected bibliography 
 Nigger at Eton, 1972
 John Bull's Nigger, 1974
 Sex is a Nigger's Game, 1976
 Juju, 1977
 Secret Society, 1978
 The Return: Homecoming of a Negro from Eton, 1978
 Chief Onyeama: The Story of an African God, 1982
 African Legend: The Incredible Story of Francis Arthur Nzeribe, 1984
 The New Man: A Perspective in Evil, 2002
 Dadi: The Man, the Legend : an Intimate Portrait of His Excellency Judge Charles Dadi Onyeama of the International Court of Justice, The Hague, 2021

References 

1951 births
2022 deaths
Nigerian non-fiction writers
Nigerian publishers (people)
People educated at Eton College